Gene Robillard (January 15, 1929 – April 24, 2007) was a Canadian football quarterback who played one season with the BC Lions of the Canadian Football League. He played CIS football at McGill University and attended Ottawa Technical High School in Ottawa, Ontario. Robillard was also a member of the Montreal Alouettes. He later coached the Ottawa Sooners.

References

External links
Just Sports Stats
Fanbase profile

1929 births
2007 deaths
Players of Canadian football from Ontario
Canadian football quarterbacks
McGill Redbirds football players
BC Lions players
Canadian football people from Ottawa